Mahua Kheda may refer to:

 Mahua Kheda, Berasia, a village in Madhya Pradesh, India
 Mahua Kheda, Huzur, a village in Madhya Pradesh, India
 Mahua Kheda, Raisen, a village in Madhya Pradesh, India